Matías Ramón Mella Castillo (February 25, 1816 –June 4, 1864), who was most known by his middle name (Ramón), was a Dominican revolutionary, politician, and military general. Mella is regarded as a national hero in the Dominican Republic. Remembered as one of the three founding fathers of the Dominican Republic, the Order of Merit of Duarte, Sánchez and Mella is partially named in his honor.

Like many of his peers, Mella envisioned an independent republic that would be free of all foreign power. A man of loyalty and honor, his dream to establishing and maintaining a free nation would grow in his early years, strengthening his determination to make that dream a reality. He is part of the lengendary trio responsible for shaking Haitian rule in Santo Domingo, along with Juan Pablo Duarte and Francisco del Rosario Sánchez.   

Through sheer determination and strategy, Mella would play a very crucial role into the successful establishment of the Dominican Republic. But this success was short-lived, as Mella would find himself, along with his fellow patriots, having to engage in a series of political standoffs against the very same people who had previously fought alongside him. Ill and financially crippled, he watched as many of his fellow patriots faced the worst for their pro-Independent plans. Unfortunately, by 1861, the country was handed back to Spain, setting off another war. But despite this, Mella would continue serve his duties as a revolutionary leader until his tragic death on June 4, 1864.

Early life
Mella was born to Antonio Mella Álvarez (1794–1837) and Francisca Javier Castillo Álvarez (1790–1864), both of Canarian descent, on February 25, 1816, in Santo Domingo during the España Boba period. He had two other siblings named Idelfonso (1818-1910) and Manuela Mella Castillo (1827-1894).

Very little is known in regards to his school life, but perhaps due to the scarcity of public educational centers during his childhood and adolescence, its believed that his parents chose to send him to the few "private schools" that were secretly available during that era. It was there that the young Mella would receive proper education from respectable Dominican teachers.

From a young age, he had a latent talent in handling a sword and a sabor. Since his teenage years, he was known for being brave and fearless. He would spend his early life involving himself into productive work for his society.

In 1835, during the years of the Haitian occupation, he served as head of the community of San Cristóbal. He devoted himself to cutting wood for a business, a habit that he shared with future legendary military general, Antonio Duvergé, who took note of Mella's proficiency of skill using a sabor and a sword. This, along with their shared opposition to Haitian rule, established a friendship between the two, which would then transcend and prove crucial in later years to come.

His years of wood cutting and commercial work allowed him to engage with multiple social sectors, thus allowing him to understand the social dynamics and the intricacies. But of course this was not just limited to the exploiters, but to the exploitative sector as well.

In 1836, a 20 year old Mella married Josefa Brea, the daughter of a wealthy family. Together, they produced 4 children: Ramón María, Dominga América María, Antonio Nicanor, and Ildefonso. Antonio Nicanor would go on to father Julio Antonio Mella, a Cuban activist who was later assassinated in Mexico City, Mexico. A will revealed that the marriage lacked contributions from both sides of the union. It is alleged that some of his assets in which Mella acquired during the marriage may have been due to the inheritance he received after the passing of his father.

Confusion about his name
In his baptism certificate, marriage certificate as well as in his will and official documents such as his appointment as Minister of War and later Vice President of the Dominican Republic during the restoration government, it is stated that his name was Ramón Mella Castillo and he cannot be found. any historical support, except for a few documents that he signed as MR Mella and M. Ramón Mella, that his name was Matías Ramón Mella.

In various letters that he shared with his relatives and collaborators of the independence cause, they never referred to him as Matías and in fact, they did not mention his middle name, so it is not known how or why in some history texts their first names have been exchanged. Because of this, it has led to historical confusion about his name. But in most cases, he is referred to as Matías Ramón Mella.

Revolutionary leader

First activities under Duarte
  
At some point in 1838, Mella would be introduced to the revolutionary leader Juan Pablo Duarte, who at this time was looking to recruit new members for the nationalistic movement, La Trinitaria, a secret organization that seeks to establish an independent nation by liberating the Dominican people from Haitian rule under the dictatorship of Jean-Pierre Boyer. Mella happily accepted this recruitment. He would also be introduced to other newly recruited members such as José María Serra de Castro, Feliz Maria Ruiz, and Francisco del Rosario Sánchez. Mella and Sánchez would later make a revolutionary moment in Dominican history.

Over the next five years, the Trinitarios carried out various activities in order to propagate separatist and independence ideas to other Dominicans. However, when this movement was caught on by the Haitian authorities, it became necessary to create two other organizations, which were much more flexible than La Trinitaria - La Filantrópica and La Dramática, through which awareness-raising effortd were less compromising. Within these five years, Mella and Sánchez stood out from the rest of their companions, even earning Duarte's full confidence.

Duarte saw in Mella, a man of great discipline and leadership quantities, characteristics to which Duarte deemed perfect to substitute for candidate Juan Nepomuceno Ravelo, after the failure of his arrival, by the commission of Duarte. Mella, at the request of Duarte, was sent to the Haitian village of Les Cayes, with the mission of looking for allies to form a reform movement, with the purpose to overthrow Boyer's regime in January 1843. There, Mella stayed at the house of Jérôme-Maximilien Borgella, a Haitian general and politician, who was also a former commander of Santo Domingo. Meanwhile, Boyer's acceptance had begun to wane because of the excessive rise in taxes, the benefits of which did not revert to the population but to France, to which Boyer had promised compensation in exchange for recognizing independence. In this way, groups opposed to the Boyer regime arose in Haiti itself. By this time the island had become increasingly frustrated with Boyer's repressive dictatorship, combined with his negligent response following a sudden earthquake that had struck Haiti a year earlier, and were plotting to overthrow the government, a situation to which Duarte believed could be used as an advantage.   

Subsequently, Mella came into contact with the Haitian opposition leader Charles Hérard, who in turn led the reform movement, which came to be known as La Reforma, in March 1843. It only took Mella several days to reach agreements with the revolutionaries. Thanks to Mella's demonstration of diplomatic skills, the Trinitarios placed themselves in a solid position against the Haitian Reformists and were able to organize themselves in favor of the movement. Although, for Hérard, he was completely unaware of the Dominicans true purpose was to prepare for the definitive separation of the Haitian government. Together they managed to topple Boyer in May 1843, thus finally ending Boyer's reign of tyranny once and for all.

In June of that same year, Duarte, who considered necessary it for the next stage of the cause, entrusted Mella to return to Santo Domingo with the mission to disseminating the political ideas advocated by the revolutionaries. Thus, in July 1843, Mella departed from Les Ceyes, and moved to the Central Cibao to continue promoting his republican Ideals for independence. However, Hérard, who was now the president of Haiti, learned of the true motives of Mella and his companions, and traveled to the eastern part of the island to arrest the conspirators. He would imprison Mella in Port-au-Prince, where he remained for two months. However, in this very city a rebellion erupted against Hérard, who was only able to dominate with the help of Mella and the incarcerated veterans whom he freed.

Manifesto of January 16, 1844

As civil unrest continued to erupt in Haiti, Mella used the opportunity to return to Santo Domingo to proceed to the next phase of independence. But by now, Duarte was not present due to his exile when learning of the tenacious persecution that would be made against him by the Haitians. This left the Trinitarios were without their leader. So therefore, the leadership of the revolution was handed over to Sánchez. It was agreed then that the date of which the declaration of Independence and the birth of the new nation was arranged for February 27.

In January 1844, Sánchez drafted a manifesto of independence, and at Mella's suggestion, handed it over to the conservative Tomas Bobadilla for publishing. The final version, which was produced on January 16, featured signatures from collective members between both parties, including Mella, Sánchez, Bobadilla, and many others.

Declaration of Dominican independence

Sources vary on how the events of the "blundebuss" shot transpired. It is said that on the night of February 27, 1844, when he was reunited with other conspirators at Puerta de La Misericordia (Mercy Gate), Matías Ramón Mella fired a shot to end the hesitation that threatened to bring failure. He fired his blunderbuss and the Patriots marched toward the stronghold of San Gennaro (today Conde Gate), where another patrician, Francisco del Rosario Sánchez, proclaimed to the world the birth of the Dominican Republic. A testimony, written by Eustache Juchereaux Saint Denys, a member of the French consul in Santo Domingo, who had heard the famous blunderbuss, writes:

José María Serra de Castro, one of the founders of La Trinitaria, who was an author of one of the main historical sources of the 1844 revolution, wrote that once Duartistas and Febreristas met at La Misercordia, they found that the number of attendees was less than expected. He explains:

However, Don Manuel de Jesús Galván, a politician and author, narrates those events in these terms:

Independent Republic

After the proclamation of the First Republic, Mella took part in the Central Government Board, with Sánchez serving as president. On March 2, Mella sent a letter to Duarte, Pérez and Pińa, all of whom were in Curaçao, informing them of the success of the revolt and of affairs of the Dominican Republic. A few days later, Mella had left for the Cibao in order to enlist José María Imbert, from Moca, as second in command of the newly constituted National Army, which would later become the Liberation Army. Mella would also assume the position of governor of Santiago and delegate of the Central Government Board, acting as chief political and general for the army.

But at that moment, Mella received news from Cap-Haïtien that the new Haitian president, Jean-Louis Pierrot, who did not accept the independence of the Dominican Republic, was approaching Santiago. With this sudden update, Mella heads out on tour throughout the region to not only warn his comrades, but to also enlist more soldiers, but not before giving instructions to Imbert, who was now the lieutenant, to combat the upcoming attack. This was a success, as Imbert's forces were able to repel off the attack and drive the Haitian army out of the country in the Battle of Santiago.

Events took a different turn following the victory in the Battle of Azua. With the independence of Dominican Republic now installed, and Duarte's return to the country, Mella voted to elect him as president of the Central Government Board with the purpose of preventing another annexation by any foreign power. He would address this in a letter to Sánchez:

Despite having successfully expelling the Haitians from the country, many sectors of the country felt that the new nation could not survive without being annexed to a colonial power. This caused a long-standing divide between the independent Trinitarians and the pro-annexation sectors within the country. This in turn resulted in public disputes, which at times turned for the worse.

For instance, Tomás Bobadilla, the conservative president of the Central Governing Board and advocate for the Trinitarios, attempted to annex the Dominican Republic to France, but was deposed in a joint coup led by Sánchez, and Mella. In response to the coup d'état, military general Pedro Santana, initiated a coup in return, and sent Duarte, Mella, and Sánchez into exile. These stand offs and many more, would continue to transpire, resulting in more of the Trinitarios being forced out of the country, even resulting into the deaths of many of the patriots, such as María Trinidad Sánchez, aunt of Francisco del Rosario Sánchez, as well as the death of his trusted comrade and fellow war hero, Antonio Duvergé, along with his son. The deaths of his fellow collaborators caused Mella to be overwhelmed with guilt and sadness for the remainder of his life.

While in exile, Mella chose to settle in Puerto Rico, opting to remain close to his homeland.   
Eventually in 1848, Mella, along with Sánchez, was granted an amnesty decreed by president Manuel Jimenes to return to the country. Upon his return, he resettled in Puerto Plata, working in the wood cuts, away from political affaris. held many important positions. For instance, he rejoined the army once again, and participated in the Battle of Las Carreras, a renewed Haitian invasion, securing victory once again. But unfortunately, this victory allowed Santana to renew his political confidence, and would go on to overthrow Jimenes for the presidential seat. Jimenes was exiled twice before eventually settling in Haiti, where he did on December 22, 1854.

When Buenaventura Baez became president in September 1849, Mella was appointed Secretary of State for Commerce and the Treasury. He even briefly served as Minister of Finance of the Dominican Republic from 1849 to 1850.

When Santana returns for a third term, Mella became a Secretary for his government. In addition, he was named Commander of Arms, Governor, and was even sent on special mission to the government of Spain to manage the recognition of Independence in 1854. This mission lasted for six months. During this mission, it has been argued that during negotiations, Spanish officials attempted to persuade Mella to instead propose a protectorate to the Dominican government, rather than recognize independence. Mella, still holding onto the morals of the Trinitarios, flatly rejected an offer he deemed as a despicable proposition. By May 1854, Mella decided to return to Dominican Republic, but not before addressing in a farewell letter to the Count of San Luis, who was the President of the Council of Ministers, the reluctance of the Spanish government to recognize the independence of the Dominican Republic. In that letter, he writes:

In July 1856, he was tasked to draft a bill with the purpose of organizing the army, once again demonstrating his skills as a combatant and military man.

When the revolution against Buenaventura Baez began in Santiago on July 7, 1857, who with his economic mistakes had led the country to the threshold of a financial catastrophe, Mella was one of the first to join tgat movement of liberal and neo-Duartust orientation. In this famous civil war, Mella consolidated his immense military prestige a with the audacious seizure of Plaza de Semaná, which he personally directed at the beginning of May 1858. For his heroic action, he received one of the most brilliant and jubilant receptions that the people of Santiago gave him, of which the government was headed by José Desiderio Valverde. 

During this time, however, the nation fell into a  political and economic turmoil. Buenaventura Báez, the newly elected president following the resignation of Jimenes, failed to come to a mutual political agreement with Santana, and was ruling the country under a corrupt bureaucracy. He would bankrupt the national treasury for his profit, and propose that the country be annexed to United States. Santana, on the other hand, presided over the country with Báez, but ruled the nation under military dictatorship. He would eventually overthrow and send Báez into exile. From 1849 to 1861, Santana would continue to propose that the country be annexed with Spain, which Mella strongly rejected.

Also plunging the nation's economy were the constant Haitian invasions. Haiti had already made numerous attempts to reconquer the Dominican Republic, but each attempt was crushed by the Dominicans, who despite being greatly outnumbered, managed to successfully rebel off every invasion so far. These attempts would intensify as Haiti's new leader, Faustin Soulouque, having just declared himself emperor, made more drastic and desperate attempts to bring the island under his control. From 1849 to 1856, Soulouque made numerous attempts to reconquer the Dominican Republic, including one instant where Soulouque, at the head of a 30,000-man army, marched into the eastern side of the island, with the purpose of reinstalling Haitian rule. His efforts failed, his army retreated after suffering heavy losses, and Soulouque came close to falling into the hands of the Dominican army. His support eroded over the years, mostly from Haitian women, fearful of losing their sons, brothers, and husbands in these failed invasions. He would later be overthrown in a coup d'état, led by his former general Fabre Geffrard, in 1859, and sent into exile in Jamaica. He returned to Haiti at some point just in time to see Geffrard himself be overthrown in 1867, and died that same year at age 84.

Final struggle for independence

Return of Spanish rule

Despite the country's independence being secured, the nation was still in a crisis. Following the conclusion of the war, Santana had inherited a bankrupted government that was on the brink of collapse. His misrule of his power, as well as the aftermath of Baez's corrupt government, drastically exhausted the nation treasury. Faced with the economic turmoil, and fearful of another invasion from Haiti, Santana turned to a foreign power for protection. After failing to reach an agreement with France, he eventually turned to Spain, with Queen Isabella II. In exchange for honorary privileges, military and economic intervention, Santana agreed to return the Dominican Republic back to colonial status. Spain, who by now was losing control of most of its former colonies, used this opportunity to reinsert its control in Latin America. The U.S., busy with its Civil War, was left unable to enforce the Monroe Doctrine. This decision caused a national uproar among the population. Mella, of course, did not accept this, and along with his fellow patriots, pledged their full opposition to the annexation. But because of this, he would be imprisoned by Santana, who confined him to the fearsome Tower of Homage, (present-day Ozama Fortress) for 72 days. He would later be deported to Saint Thomas. 

On March 20, 1861, the annexation to Spain was finalized, and Spanish troops had already began to arrive in the country. With no time to waste, Mella made his way back to his homeland. But this would come with difficulty as Mella was without resources or military support. While on board an English ship that was stranded in Puerto Rico, he unsuccessfully attempted to ask the crew for support to go ashore on Dominican land and take command of the force with the purpose of starting his revolution. 

On June 3, he wrote a letter to Santana, once again proclaiming his opposition of the annexation. He writes:

Resistance
Mella, despite the fact by now he was battling dysentery, didn't hesitate, and joined in on the cause. He traveled through numerous sectors of the south, with the task of rounding up restoration troops for general Pedro Florentino. For his contributions, he was appointed Minister of War, in which his first act in this position was to create a war manual for the soldiers, which he produced in January 1864. The manuel included the following content: 

Around the same time, Mella would address in a manifesto:

At the time of the Capotillo Outcry (Grito de Capotillo) (16 August 1863), already very ill, Mella served as Vice President of the Dominican Republic in the government of the Restoration. He would continue to hold this place in office for the remainder of his life. Before he passed, Mella asked his followers that on the day of his death, his remains be wrapped around the Dominican flag. Living his final years in Santiago, Mella would continue to serve his duties and purposes.

Final visit from Duarte

On March 27, Mella was visited by Duarte, who had just arrived in the country during this time, at his home. Duarte had used this opportunity to greet his ailing comrade one last time. The hero Manuel Rodríguez Objío described the visit of Juan Pablo Duarte to Mella with the following words:

On June 4, 1864, in the midst of the bloody war, Mella, the beloved founding father and honorable revolutionary, died in his small home near San Luis Fortress, at the young age of 48. He was accompanied by his wife, Josefa, family members and some neighbors. In accordance to his final wishes, his body was wrapped around the Dominican flag, and buried as he desired.

The Dominican Restoration War continued on after his death throughout the nation. Many on both sides were lost, but thanks to Mella's war manuel, this became a crucial asset for the Dominican rebels, despite once again facing an outnumering force, would still oversee more victories against Spain. This ultimately lead to the decisive victory of the Dominicans, who, (yet again), triumphed over the Spanish Empire, successfully expelling the Spanish forces off the island and restoring the national independence in 1865. Santana, discraced and facing trial, died on June 29, 1864 at age 63, 25 days after Mella's passing.

Legacy

Mella, a man of great military talent, served his purpose of being one of the greatest figures in the history of the Dominican Republic. Of the founding fathers of the Republic, Mella represented the militant and determined expression and the most adapted to the political activities of a pre-capitalist society. A man of respect and dignity, his loyalty to his comrades, as well as the nation remained a driving force in Mella. From the joining the Trinitarios, the battles fought with Haiti, internal disputes, and the restoration war against Spain, Mella stayed true to his word. Even despite of the dark period between the Dominican War of Independence and the Spanish occupation of the Dominican Republic, his vision and desire of an independent Dominican state always remained with him to the end. Before his death, during the occupation of Spain, Mella was quoted as saying:

Up until 1891, his body remained buried in Santiago, where he lived in his final years. It wasn't until at the request of Sociedad Hijos del Pueblo, his remains were exhumed and transferred to Santo Domingo, where they buried his, along with that of Duarte and Sánchez, in the Chapel of the Immortals of the Primate Cathedral of America.  

Three years later in 1894, through the Resolution No. 332 of April 11, dictator Ulises Heureaux ordered that Duarte, Mella, and Sánchez were the official Founding Fathers of the Dominican Republic. Since then, Dominicans venerate the memory of Mella, and of his illustrious companions, as the Founders of the Dominican Republic. On February 27, 1944, 100 years after the independence, Rafael Trujillo ordered that these remains would once again be transferred to Puerta del Conde, where they are converted into the Altar of the Homeland, and deposited under the triumphal arch of that memorable monument.   

In addition, Mella was awarded many honors for his revolutionary status. 
 He is entombed in a beautiful mausoleum, Altar de la Patria, at the Count's Gate (Puerta del Conde) alongside Duarte and Sánchez.
 In the province of Independencia, the city of Mella is named in his honor. 
 Many streets in the Dominican Republic are named after him.
 In the city of Santo Domingo, a statue has been made in his honor.
 Mella is solely depicted on the 10 Dominican peso note and coin; he is also depicted on the 100 Dominican peso note alongside Duarte and Sánchez.
 A Dominican anthem is dedicated to his legacy

Ancestry

See also
 History of the Dominican Republic
 España Boba 
 Dominican War of Independence 
 Dominican Restoration War 
 Military of the Dominican Republic 
 Dominican Army 
 Juan Pablo Duarte 
 Francisco del Rosario Sánchez 
 Antonio Duvergé 
 José Maria Imbert

Sources
Historical website of the Consulate General of the Dominican Republic in New York
Historia Dominicana en Gráficas

References

External links

People from Santo Domingo
1816 births
1864 deaths
Independence activists
19th-century Dominican Republic people
19th-century rebels
Vice presidents of the Dominican Republic
Finance ministers of the Dominican Republic
War ministers of the Dominican Republic
Dominican Republic governors
People of the Dominican War of Independence
People of the Dominican Restoration War 
Dominican Republic people of Canarian descent
Dominican Republic revolutionaries
Dominican Republic independence activists
Dominican Republic diplomats
Dominican Republic military leaders
Caribbean political people
Hispanic and Latino
Latin American people
Dominican Republic nationalists
White Dominicans
Dominican Republic politicians